The Rise is the third studio album by the Spanish DJ and producer DJ Sammy. It is a trance music album with chill out influences.

Track listing

Personnel
 Markus Birkle – guitar
 Martin Eyerer – producer
 Oliver Laib – producer
 Britta Medeiros – vocals
 Tesz Millan – vocals
 David Whitley – vocals

External links
 

DJ Sammy albums
2005 albums